Jerry Foltz (born August 14, 1962) is an American former professional golfer and current commentator for the LIV Golf Invitational Series. He was formerly a long time commentator for the Golf Channel.

Amateur career
Foltz was born in Las Vegas, Nevada. He played his college golf for the University of Arizona and was an All-Pac-10 selection in 1984. In 1989, he won the Arizona Amateur.

Professional career 
Foltz turned professional in 1990, and claimed one victory on the Nike Tour (now the Web.com Tour) in 1995. He has seven career holes-in-one. In 1990, three days after turning professional, Foltz sustained a serious back injury in an auto accident involving a drunk driver. Foltz was determined to overcome the injury and went on to success on the Nike Tour.

Broadcasting career 
His broadcasting career began as he was still committed to his playing career.

"Jerry's ability to analyze the game coupled with his talent for articulating his thoughts in an entertaining way has propelled him into the world of golf commentary."

Foltz has served in multiple roles for Golf Channel, including:
 On-course reporter for Nationwide Tour, LPGA Tour and PGA Tour coverage.
 Play-by-play host for Nationwide Tour coverage (2008–present).
 Host of "Quest for the Card", a regular show about the Nationwide Tour.
 Has made numerous appearances on studio shows, including Golf Central, Academy Live, Top 1
 Morning Drive

In June 2022, it was confirmed that Foltz had left the Golf Channel to join the commentary team at the LIV Golf Invitational Series.

Quotes 
"Golf is an art, not a science."
"Don't drink and drive, use a 3 wood."

Personal life
Foltz and his wife Jane have one son, Jackson; they reside in Orlando, Florida.

Professional wins (2)

Nike Tour wins (1)

Other wins (1)
1994 Newport Classic

Results in major championships

CUT = missed the halfway cut
Note: Foltz only played in the U.S. Open.

References

External links

American male golfers
Arizona Wildcats men's golfers
PGA Tour golfers
Golfers from Nevada
Golfers from Orlando, Florida
Golf writers and broadcasters
Sportspeople from the Las Vegas Valley
Sportspeople from Orlando, Florida
1962 births
Living people
LIV Golf